Harpesaurus beccarii, also known commonly as the Sumatra nose-horned lizard or the Sumatran nose-horned lizard, is a species of lizard in the family Agamidae. The species is endemic to Sumatra, Indonesia.

Etymology
The specific name, beccarii, is in honor of Italian botanist Odoardo Beccari.

Description
The rostral appendage, which measures , is double, consisting of a longer anterior "horn" and a shorter posterior "horn". The body is bluish green dorsally.

Reproduction
H. beccarii is oviparous.

References

Further reading
Böhme W (1989). "Rediscovery of the Sumatran agamid lizard Harpesaurus beccarii Doria 1888, with the first notes on a live specimen". Tropical Zoology 2: 31–35.
Doria G (1888). "Note erpetologiche. I. Alcuni nuovi sauri raccolti in Sumatra dal D.re O. Beccari ". Annali del Museo Civico di Storia Naturale di Genova, Serie Seconda 6: 646–652 + Plate VIII. (Harpesaurus beccarii, new species, pp. 646–648 + Plate VIII, figure 2). (in Italian).
Manthey U (1990). "Das Portrait: Harpesaurus beccarii Doria ". Sauria 12 (3): 1–2. (in German).

Harpesaurus
Reptiles of Indonesia
Endemic fauna of Sumatra
Reptiles described in 1888
Taxa named by Giacomo Doria